Governor Guy may refer to:

Geoffrey Colin Guy (1921–2006), Governor of Dominica from 1965 until 1967 and Governor of Saint Helena from 1976 to 1980
John Guy (governor) (died 1629), 1st proprietary governor of Newfoundland Colony from 1610 to 1614
William L. Guy (1919–2013), 26th Governor of North Dakota